Michael Grimes may refer to:

 Michael Grimes (investment banker) (born 1966), American technologist and banker
 Michael Grimes (scientist) (1888–1977), Irish professor of microbiology